Sezefredo da Costa (7 November 1912 – 4 August 1949), known as Cardeal, was a Brazilian footballer. He played in two matches for the Brazil national football team in 1937. He was also part of Brazil's squad for the 1937 South American Championship.

References

External links
 
 

1912 births
1949 deaths
Brazilian footballers
Brazil international footballers
Sportspeople from Rio Grande do Sul
Association football forwards
Sport Club São Paulo players
Club Nacional de Football players
Fluminense FC players
Brazilian expatriate footballers
Expatriate footballers in Uruguay